Elachista protensa is a moth of the family Elachistidae, it is found in Australia.

References

Moths described in 2011
protensa
Moths of Australia